Micra is a car produced by Nissan.

Micra may also refer to:
 Medical Injury Compensation Reform Act, the California medical malpractice liability insurance act
 Micra (moth), a moth genus also known as Eublemma
 The old plural form of the length unit micron

See also
Mikra (disambiguation)